That's Not What I Heard is the debut studio album by the American garage rock band Gossip (under their old name The Gossip), it was released on January 23, 2001.

Track listing

 "Swing Low" – 1:18
 "Got All This Waiting" – 1:47
 "Bones" – 2:09
 "Sweet Baby" – 1:41
 "Tuff Luv" – 1:14
 "Got Body If You Want It" – 2:02
 "Where the Girls Are" – 1:44
 "Bring It On" – 2:26
 "Heartbeats" – 1:44
 "Catfight" – 1:15
 "Jailbreak" – 1:23
 "Southern Comfort" – 1:07
 "And You Know..." – 1:49
 "Hott Date" – 2:16

Personnel
 Beth Ditto – vocals, piano
 Brace Paine – guitar, bass guitar
 Kathy Mendonça – drums

References 

2001 debut albums
Gossip (band) albums
Kill Rock Stars albums